On Photography is a 1977 collection of essays by Susan Sontag. It originally appeared as a series of essays in the New York Review of Books between 1973 and 1977.

Contents

In the book, Sontag expresses her views on the history and present-day role of photography in capitalist societies as of the 1970s. Sontag discusses many examples of modern photography. Among these, she contrasts Diane Arbus's work with that of Depression-era documentary photography commissioned by the Farm Security Administration.

She also explores the history of American photography in relation to the idealistic notions of America put forth by Walt Whitman and traces these ideas through to the increasingly cynical aesthetic notions of the 1970s, particularly in relation to Arbus and Andy Warhol.

Sontag argues that the proliferation of photographic images had begun to establish within people a "chronic voyeuristic relation to the world." Among the consequences of this practice of photography is that the meaning of all events is leveled and made equal.

As she argues, perhaps originally with regard to photography, the medium fostered an attitude of anti-intervention. Sontag says that the individual who seeks to record cannot intervene, and that the person who intervenes cannot then faithfully record, for the two aims contradict each other. In this context, she discusses in some depth the relationship of photography to politics.

Criticism and acclaim
On Photography won the National Book Critics Circle Award for Criticism for 1977 and was selected among the top 20 books of 1977 by the editors of the New York Times Book Review. In 1977, William H. Gass, writing in The New York Times, said the book "shall surely stand near the beginning of all our thoughts upon the subject" of photography.

In a 1998 appraisal of the work, Michael Starenko, wrote in Afterimage that "On Photography has become so deeply absorbed into this discourse that Sontag's claims about photography, as well as her mode of argument, have become part of the rhetorical 'tool kit' that photography theorists and critics carry around in their heads." He added that "no other photography book, not even The Family of Man (1955), which sold four million copies before finally going out of print in 1978, received a wider range of press coverage than On Photography."

Sontag's work is literary and polemical rather than academic. It includes no bibliography and few notes. There is little sustained analysis of the work of any particular photographer and is not in any sense a research project, as often written by doctoral students. For example, in her discussion of The Family of Man exhibition she quotes almost word-for-word Roland Barthes' critique in his book Mythologies, without acknowledgement; "By purporting to show that individuals are born, work, laugh, and die everywhere in the same way, "The Family of Man" denies the determining weight of history - of genuine and historically embedded differences, injustices, and conflicts." Many of the reviews from the world of Fine-art photography that followed On Photography at the time of its publication were skeptical and often hostile, such as those of Colin L. Westerbeck and Michael Lesy.

In 2003, Sontag published a partial refutation of the opinions she espoused in On Photography in her book Regarding the Pain of Others. This book may be considered as a postscript or addition to On Photography. Sontag's publishing history includes a similar sequence with regard to her work Illness as Metaphor from the 1970s and AIDS and Its Metaphors a decade later, which included an expansion of ideas contained in the earlier work.

Editions
New York: Farrar, Straus and Giroux, 1977. .
London: Allan Lane, 1978. .
New York: Anchor Books, 1990. .
Reprinted in Sontag: Essays of the 1960s & 1970s, Library of America, 2013. . Includes endnotes.

Earlier versions of these essays appeared in The New York Review of Books:
Volume 20, No. 16 (October 18, 1973).
Volume 20, No. 18 (November 15, 1973).
Volume 21, No. 6 (April 18, 1974).
Volume 21, No. 19 (November 28, 1974).
Volume 23, No. 21 & 22 (January 20, 1977).
Volume 24, No. 11 (June 23, 1977).

References

External links

Susan Sontag's official website

Photographic collections and books
1977 non-fiction books
Works by Susan Sontag
Works originally published in The New York Review of Books
National Book Critics Circle Award-winning works
American essay collections
Farrar, Straus and Giroux books